(I'm) Stranded is the debut album by Australian punk rock group The Saints which was released by EMI on 21 February 1977. Their debut single, "(I'm) Stranded", was issued ahead of the album in September 1976, which Sounds magazine's reviewer, Jonh Ingham, declared was the "Single of this and every week". "Erotic Neurotic" was the second single, which was released in May 1977 and the group relocated to the United Kingdom. 

In May 2001, Australasian Performing Right Association (APRA) celebrated its 75th anniversary and named "(I'm) Stranded" in its Top 30 Australian songs of all time. In 2007, 'I'm Stranded' was one of the first 20 songs added to the National Film and Sound Archive's Sounds of Australia registry. Their debut album was listed at No. 20 in the book, 100 Best Australian Albums, in October 2010.

Background
The Saints formed in Brisbane in 1973 with original members Chris Bailey (singer-songwriter, later guitarist), Ed Kuepper (guitarist-songwriter), and Ivor Hay (drummer). In 1975, Kym Bradshaw joined on bass guitar. Contemporaneous with Ramones, the group were employing the fast tempos, raucous vocals and "buzz saw" guitar that characterised early punk rock. Kuepper explained that they played faster and faster as they were nervous in front of audiences. According to Australian rock historian, Ian McFarlane, they had developed their "own distinctive sound as defined by Kuepper's frenetic, whirlwind guitar style and Bailey's arrogant snarl".

In June 1976, The Saints recorded two tracks, "(I'm) Stranded" and "No Time" with Mark Moffatt producing. Unable to find an interested label, they formed Fatal Records and independently released the two tracks as their debut single in September 1976. Their self-owned Eternal Promotions sent discs to radio stations and magazines both in Australia – with little local interest – and the United Kingdom. In the UK, a small label, Power Exchange, issued the single. Sounds magazine's reviewer Jonh Ingham declared it, "Single of this and every week". EMI head office in London contacted the Sydney branch and directed that they be signed to a three-album contract.

Over two days in December, the group recorded their first LP album, (I'm) Stranded (21 February 1977), with Rod Coe producing. Kuepper said later that the album was "basically our live set and were also the oldest songs. And in particularly with 'Nights In Venice' and 'Messin' With The Kid', they were the first two songs we ever did." It included a cover version of The Missing Links' track "Wild About You". On the single tracks "(I'm) Stranded" and "No Time", Kuepper's guitar was tuned up a semitone, to emulate Bo Diddley. The other eight tracks were recorded over a weekend in December 1976. Kuepper used Mark Moffatt's 1960 Fender Super amp with no effect pedals on (I'm) Stranded and No Time. On the remainder of the album he used a vocal PA as his guitar amp, after his live amp had "blown up", and an MXR Distortion Plus pedal. The band recorded the tracks live, though with the guitar amp in the corridor to avoid spill.

The band supported AC/DC in late December 1976 and, early in 1977, relocated to Sydney. EMI re-issued the single "(I'm) Stranded" in February 1977 and it reached the Kent Music Report Top 100 Singles Chart. In May 1977, the band released their second single, "Erotic Neurotic" and then moved to the UK, where they differed with their label over how they should be marketed. EMI planned to promote them as a typical punk band, complete with ripped clothes and spiky hair – The Saints insisted on maintaining a more downbeat image.

In 2007, (I'm) Stranded was reissued as a CD with bonus tracks including the EP One Two Three Four and the single version of "This Perfect Day". In August of that year band members Bailey and Kuepper described their work for SBS-TV's documentary Great Australian Albums.

Reception

Contemporary reviews 
Kris Needs in ZigZag May 1977 called it a "rip-snorter of an album" and "one hell of an album, although it's a bit patchy."

Robot A. Hull in Creem December 1977, reviewing the US edition released on Sire, said the Saints "easily match the savage revolt of bands like the Clash and the Jam" and called (I'm Stranded) "a pistol shot of an album worth getting stewed over."

The Village Voices Robert Christgau wrote, "intermittent hooks, droning feedback, shouted vocals, and oldie about incest, this album from Australia achieves the great mean of punk style".

 Retrospective reviews 
In his review of (I'm) Stranded, Jack Rabid of AllMusic declared that "[T]he Saints sparked the Far East punk rock movement with a blasting, blistering, scorching sound no one had heard before". Although eight of the tracks showed a "heavy, buzzing racket ... borders on unintelligible, they're so cheaply recorded".

McFarlane described it as "full of rough, exhilarating rock'n'roll noise, and it remains one of the greatest debut albums of the era".

John Ballon of MustHear writes the album is "a devastating listen, loaded with the same irresistible power ... [and] has all the intense purity of a band hell bent on making a racket, regardless of its commercial viability".

Accolades
In May 2001, Australasian Performing Right Association (APRA) celebrated its 75th anniversary and named "(I'm) Stranded" in its Top 30 Australian songs of all time. In 2007, "I'm Stranded" was one of the first 20 songs stored on the National Film and Sound Archive's Sounds of Australia registry. The album was listed at No. 20 in the book 100 Best Australian Albums in October 2010. Fact ranked it the 20th best album of the 1970s in 2014, calling it "easily one of the best – and probably the noisiest – albums to emerge from punk’s first wave."

The State Library of Queensland named its copy of "(I’m) Stranded" as one of the treasures from its John Oxley Library collection, citing the 7” vinyl single represented a piece of Australian and Queensland music history, influencing generations of bands around the world. 

Track listing

PersonnelThe Saints members Chris Bailey – vocals
 Kym Bradshaw – bass guitar (tracks 1–10, 11–13 on 2007 release)
 Ivor Hay – drums
 Ed Kuepper – guitar
 Alasdair "Algy" Ward – bass guitar (tracks 11–12 on 1997 release, 14–18 on 2007 release)Additional musicians The Flat Top Four – backing vocals (track 7)Production'
 Rod Coe – producer (except tracks 1, 6 or bonus tracks)
 Mark Moffatt – producer (only tracks 1, 6)
 Bailey, Kuepper – producer (only bonus tracks)

Notes

References

General
  Note: Archived [on-line] copy has limited functionality.
 
Specific

External links
 .
 (I'm) Stranded All Lyrics (I’m) Stranded / No Time, The Saints 1976: treasure collection of the John Oxley Library | State Library Of Queensland
(I’m) Stranded / No Time, The Saints 1976: treasure collection of the John Oxley Library

1977 debut albums
The Saints (Australian band) albums
EMI Records albums
Harvest Records albums
Sire Records albums
Captain Oi! Records albums